Mimesis is a philosophical concept.

Mimesis may also refer to:

 Linguistic mimesis, a concept in phonaesthetics
 Mimesis (biology), a form of biological mimicry in which the mimic takes on the properties of a specific object or organism, but one to which the dupe is indifferent
 Mimesis (End of You album), a 2008 alternative rock album
 Mimesis (magazine), a quarterly literary magazine
 Mimesis (mathematics), the quality of a numerical method which imitates some properties of the continuum problem
 Mimesis: The Representation of Reality in Western Literature, a book of literary criticism by Erich Auerbach
 Mimesis: Night of the Living Dead, also known as Mimesis, a 2011 horror film directed by Douglas Schulze